Baxian Caves are sea caves located in the east coast of Changbin Township, Taitung County, Taiwan.

History
Recently, the caves have been occupied and used as temples or places to place cremation ashes. However since 10 years ago, the Cultural Heritage Preservation Act was promulgated, subsequently the Taitung County Government, East Coast National Scenic Area and Changbin Township Office had been trying to take over the caves. On 22 November 2017, they finally managed to take back the last cave and completed the reclamation of all 30 caves in the area.

Geology
Baxian Cave possesses a distinctive eroded look and is famous for ruins dating from the Old Stone Age. Originally the caverns were below sea level, allowing waves to shape them, but now they are located on a high cliff—proof of the East Coast's changing surface.

See also
 Geography of Taiwan

References

Sea caves
Caves of Taiwan
Buddhist caves
Landforms of Taitung County